Greatest Hits Volume 1 is a greatest hits compilation album by The Beatles which was exclusive to Australia, Singapore and New Zealand.  The album was compiled by EMI Australia to fill in the gap between Rubber Soul and Revolver (much like  A Collection of Beatles Oldies would in 1966 in between Revolver and Sgt. Pepper's Lonely Hearts Club Band).

Background and stereo mixes

The compilation and its follow-up were both originally conceived in early 1966, when EMI Australia requested stereo tapes from their UK branch for tracks not already in the Australian vaults.  This meant the album contains the original 1965 stereo mixes of "I Want To Hold Your Hand" rather than the new stereo mixes created for the late-1966 compilation album A Collection of Beatles Oldies.

The mono editions of the album feature fold-down mono mixes, with only "She Loves You" and "I'll Get You" appearing in true mono, due to the unavailability of stereo mixes at the time of the compilation. The cover art was borrowed from the U.S. Beatles album, Beatles VI with the back cover using elements from the German album The Beatles Beat.

Releases, sales and deletion

The mono version of Greatest Hits Volume 1 was released in Australia in June 1966. The stereo version followed twenty months later.

In 1973, both volumes of the album were repackaged as a double album by EMI Australia to commemorate the 10th anniversary of the Beatles first single in Australia.  The release was titled The Beatles Australian 10th Anniversary 1963-1973 Souvenir Presentation - The Beatles' Greatest Hits Volumes 1 and 2.  Eight different Australian radio stations promoted the album by featuring their logo on eight different stickers.  The album was only available for a few months before it was quietly deleted.

By mid-1973, both volumes of the compilation had sold over 100,000 in Australia.  Both volumes stayed in print in Australia until EMI Australia ceased vinyl production in 1991.  The album was released on cassette but never released compact disc.

Track listing

References

External links
 Fixing a hole - the great lost Aussie Beatles collection
 

Albums produced by George Martin
The Beatles compilation albums
1966 greatest hits albums
Soundtrack compilation albums
Parlophone compilation albums
Albums arranged by George Martin